Oregon Route 429 (OR 429) is an Oregon state highway running from OR 58 at Crescent Lake Junction to Lava Odell Road in Crescent Lake. OR 429 is known as the Crescent Lake Highway No. 429 (see Oregon highways and routes).

OR 429 was established in 2002 as part of Oregon's project to assign route numbers to highways that previously were not assigned, and, as of July 2020, was unsigned.

Route description 

OR 429 begins at an intersection with OR 58 at Crescent Lake Junction and heads southwest to Crescent Lake, where it ends at an intersection with Lava Odell Road.

History 

OR 429 was assigned to the Crescent Lake Highway in 2002.

Major intersections

References 
 Oregon Department of Transportation, Descriptions of US and Oregon Routes, https://web.archive.org/web/20051102084300/http://www.oregon.gov/ODOT/HWY/TRAFFIC/TEOS_Publications/PDF/Descriptions_of_US_and_Oregon_Routes.pdf, page 31.
 Oregon Department of Transportation, Crescent Lake Highway No. 429, ftp://ftp.odot.state.or.us/tdb/trandata/maps/slchart_pdfs_1980_to_2002/Hwy429_2000.pdf

429
Transportation in Klamath County, Oregon